Martina Basanta Cariddi (born 30 May 2001) is a Spanish film and television actress known for her role as Mencía Blanco in the Netflix series Élite.

Biography 
Martina was born on May 30, 2001 in Chamartín, Madrid, to a Spanish father and Italian mother.

Career 
She began in the world of acting in 2010, at the Escuela Municipal de Arte Dramático de Madrid, with a theater course. Later, She enrolled in Cristina Rota's Centro de Nuevos Creadores, where she took basic acting courses, and in the Juan Codina Studio, taking a course in dramatic art. In 2017, she made her first foray into the acting world in the film El guardián invisible, directed by Fernando González Molina.

In 2018, she appeared in an episode of season 19 of Cuéntame cómo pasó, playing Laura. A year later, she played a small role in the feature film Mientras dure la guerra by Alejandro Amenábar. In 2021, she starred in a short film by Luis Grajera Muere padre muere.

Her inclusion in the fourth season of the Netflix series Élite, where she plays Mencía Blanco, was announced in 2020.

Filmography

Cinema

Television

Programs

References

External links 
 Martina Cariddi on IMDb
 Martina Cariddi on Instagram

Spanish television actresses
Spanish film actresses
Living people
2001 births
Spanish people of Italian descent